Natpudan Apsara (is a 2013 Indian Tamil-language talk show that aired every Saturday on Thanthi TV from 13 July 2013 to 1 January 2014, for 26 episodes. The show is hosted by Apsara 2356, This is the Second TV show in India hosted by a transgender person.

Guests included
Epi 01: Dhanush & Amala Paul
Epi 02: Anirudh Ravichander & Namitha
Epi 03: Silambarasan & Priya Anand
Epi 04: Vijay Sethupathi & Varalaxmi Sarathkumar
Epi 05: Sivakarthikeyan & Ramya Krishnan
Epi 06: Selvaraghavan & Gitanjali
Epi 07: Simran & Taapsee Pannu
Epi 08: Yuvan Shankar Raja & Aishwarya R. Dhanush
Epi 09: Chinni Jayanth & Lakshmy Ramakrishnan
Epi 10: Vijay Antony & Sunitha Sarathy

References

External links
 Official website 
 Thanthi TV on YouTube

2013 Tamil-language television series debuts
Tamil-language talk shows
Tamil-language television shows
2014 Tamil-language television series endings
Transgender-related television shows
2010s LGBT-related television series